Shingebiss is an Ojibwa (Chippewa) Native American story which exemplifies the strength of the underdog and the virtue of perseverance and fortitude. It is traditionally told about a duck who defies the harsh cold winter while others cower. 

While Shingebiss is sometimes depicted as a young woman in the story, the role of the underdog hero is more often occupied by a duck. Despite the common portrayal of the protagonist as a merganser duck, zhingibis in the Ojibwe language means "waterhen," "coot" or "grebe."

In the story, Shingebiss, a resourceful waterfowl, lives in a lodge by a lake and goes about his daily life during the winter. Kabibona'kan, the winter-maker (from the Ojibwe Gaa-biboonikaan), sees that the small duck is unaffected by the cold and inhospitable conditions, and does everything in his power to defeat him. When nothing works, Kabibona'kan eventually admits defeat, and praises the strength of Shingebiss, the resilient little duck who cannot be frozen or starved. Throughout the story Shingebiss does not acknowledge Winter Maker as an enemy, but simply a fellow creature who cannot harm him. According to Ojibwe legend, Shingebiss has ever since served as a reminder of perseverance and fortitude.

Notes

References
Johnston, Basil. Ojibway Heritage. Columbia University Press (New York: 1976). 
The Baldwin Project – The Red Indian Fairy Book by Francis Jenkins Olcott
Van Laan, Nancy. Shingebiss : An Ojibwe Legend. Houghton Mifflin (September 9, 1997) •

External links
The Hell-Diver and the Spirit of Winter, Ojibwe Oral Tradition

See also
 The North Wind and the Sun

Anishinaabe mythology